Manoucheka Pierre Louis (born 24 June 1989) is a Haitian women's association football player who plays as a midfielder.

External links 
 

1989 births
Living people
Women's association football midfielders
Haitian women's footballers
Haiti women's international footballers
Competitors at the 2014 Central American and Caribbean Games
Women's Premier Soccer League players
Haitian expatriate footballers
Haitian expatriate sportspeople in the United States
Expatriate women's soccer players in the United States